Bruce Donald Hara (born 28 April 1975) is a former cricketer who played List A cricket for the ACT Comets in the Mercantile Mutual Cup.

Hara, who was born in Canberra, made two appearances for the Comets in Australia's domestic one-day competition, both in the 1998/99 season. On debut he was run out for one by Michael Hussey at Manuka Oval and in his other match, at Adelaide Oval, he was trapped LBW for a duck by fast bowler Paul Wilson.

He has also played cricket in England before and after his season at the Comets, with stints as a professional for Lancashire clubs Barnoldswick and Heywood.

References

External links

1975 births
Living people
Australian cricketers
ACT Comets cricketers
Cricketers from the Australian Capital Territory